St Leonards railway station is located on the North Shore line, serving the Sydney suburb of St Leonards including the nearby Artarmon Industrial Area and Gore Hill. It is served by Sydney Trains T1 North Shore line services.

History
St Leonards station opened on 1 January 1890 as the terminus station of the North Shore line from Hornsby. On 1 May 1893, the line was extended south to Milsons Point.

In August 1989, the station was relocated to a temporary station south of the Pacific Highway to allow the site to be redeveloped. After the redevelopment encountered financial problems and remained dormant for a number of years, the new station was not completed until February 2000 as part of The Forum shopping plaza development.

The new station was built with two island platforms to allow extra lines to be laid as part of a plan to quadruple the line.

Platforms and services

There is an unwired siding linked to the up track. It is equipped with catch points, and is 205m long (of which 168m is usable, enough to stable an 8-car suburban train). The points are manually operated by a lever next to the track. This also means the signals, which are controlled from Homebush Control Centre, cannot permit a movement to or from the siding. Additionally, as the points cannot be controlled by the signaller, any driver on the up track passing a signal at stop must proceed with caution, making sure there are no trains moving in or out of the siding. Although long enough for an 8 car suburban train, it is not electrified and generally used for track work vehicles on occasions.

Transport links
Busways operates seven routes via St Leonards station:
252: King Street Wharf to Gladesville
254: McMahons Point wharf to Riverview
265: North Sydney to Lane Cove
286: Milsons Point to Denistone East (peak hours only)
287: Milsons Point to Ryde (peak hours only)
290: Sussex St and Erskine St to Epping
291: McMahons Point wharf to Epping

Hillsbus operate three routes via St Leonards station:, all peak hours only
602X: North Sydney to Rouse Hill
612X: Milsons Point to Riley T-way
622: Milsons Point to Dural

Keolis Downer Northern Beaches operate two routes via St Leonards station:
114: Balmoral to Royal North Shore Hospital
144: Manly to Chatswood station

Transdev John Holland operates one route via St Leonards station:
200: Bondi Junction station to Gore Hill (peak hours only)

Transit Systems operates one route via St Leonards station:
320: Green Square to Gore Hill

St Leonards station is served by two NightRide routes:
N90: Hornsby station to Town Hall station
N91: Bondi Junction station to Macquarie Park station

References

External links

St Leonards station details Transport for New South Wales
St Leonards station Public Transport Map Transport for NSW

Easy Access railway stations in Sydney
Railway stations in Sydney
Railway stations in Australia opened in 1890
St Leonards, New South Wales
North Shore railway line